Lockney Independent School District is a public school district based in Lockney, Texas (USA).

Located in Floyd County, a very small portion of the district extends into Hale County.

In 2009, the school district was rated "academically acceptable" by the Texas Education Agency.

Schools
Lockney High School (Grades 9-12)
Lockney Junior High School (Grades 6-8)
Lockney Elementary School (Grades PK-5)
Providence School (Grade 1-8) Grad would then attend Lockney High School

2009 fire
A fire on January 11, 2009 destroyed the 80-year-old Lockney High School building and damaged the junior high building as well.

References

External links
Lockney ISD

School districts in Floyd County, Texas
School districts in Hale County, Texas